North Road Quarry, Bath is a 0.3 hectare geological Site of Special Scientific Interest close to Sham Castle in the city of Bath, Somerset, notified in 1990.

It is a Geological Conservation Review site because it contains an exposure of Oolite, which shows a very clear example of dip-and-fault structure. In addition it reveals Pleistocene 'plateaugravels' made up of flint, chert, limestone, coal, shales, sandstone and conglomerate, sometimes in a silty matrix, sometimes clast supported.

References 

Sites of Special Scientific Interest in Avon
Sites of Special Scientific Interest notified in 1990
Geography of Bath, Somerset
Quarries in Somerset